Robbins House may refer to:

Unni Robbins II House, Newington, Connecticut, listed on the National Register of Historic Places (NRHP) in Hartford County
David Robbins Homestead, Milton, Delaware, listed on the NRHP in Sussex County
Judge George Robbins House, Titusville, Florida, listed on the NRHP in Brevard County
Samuel W. Robbins House, Cave Spring, Georgia, listed on the NRHP in Floyd County
Joseph Robbins House, Barnstable, Massachusetts, listed on the NRHP in Barnstable County
George Robbins House, Carlisle, Massachusetts, listed on the NRHP in Middlesex County
Hildreth-Robbins House, Chelmsford, Massachusetts, listed on the NRHP in Middlesex County
Wendell P. and Harriet Rounds Robbins House, Benton Harbor, Michigan, listed on the NRHP in Berrien County
Robbins House (Jayess, Mississippi), listed on the NRHP in Lawrence County
Simeon B. Robbins House, Franklinville, New York, listed on the NRHP in Cattaraugus County
Robbins-Melcher-Schatz Farmstead, Tualatin, Oregon, listed on the NRHP in Clackamas County
Alice H. Robbins House, Austin, Texas, listed on the NRHP in Travis County

See also
John Robbins House (disambiguation)